Tun Datu Mustapha Memorial is a state memorial in Sabah, Malaysia. The memorial was built on the place of the Islam cemetery of Kampung Ulu/Ulu Seberang in Putatan. Formerly, the small hill was one of Mat Salleh's forts. It was erected by Sabah state government on 1999.

Notable features
 Memorial gardens
 Makam Tun Datu Mustapha
 The patriots 
 Tun Mustapha Gallery 

Buildings and structures in Sabah
Mausoleums in Malaysia